Kiki or Ki Ki may refer to:

Places
 Ki Ki, South Australia, Australia, a village
 Ki Ki, Iran, a village
 Kiai, Iran, a village also known as Kiki
 Kiki, Łask County, Poland, a village
 Kiki, Poddębice County, Poland, a village
 Kiki Station, a train station in Minami, Japan

People 
 Kiki (name), a list of people with the given name, nickname or surname
 Kiki Dee, stage name of British singer Pauline Matthews (born 1947)
 Xu Jiaqi (born 1995), Chinese singer and actress known as "Kiki"
 Alice Prin (1901–1953), French artist, writer and model known as "Kiki de Montparnasse" or "Kiki"
 Kiki of Paris, pseudonym of a Parisian photographer (born 1945)

Arts and entertainment

Fictional characters 
 Kiki Strike, one of the main characters in the Kiki Strike book series by Kirsten Miller
 Kiki, the protagonist of the Japanese animated film Kiki's Delivery Service
 Kiki, a minor character in Saint Seiya, a Japanese manga series
 Kiki, a character created by the Japanese company Sanrio
 Kiki, a ferret in the Sluggy Freelance webcomic
 Kiki, a parrot in The Adventure Series novels
 Kiki, a main character in the Nickelodeon TV series The Fresh Beat Band and its spin-off Fresh Beat Band of Spies
 Kirsten Cohen, a character nicknamed "Kiki" in The O.C. TV series
 Kiki DuRane, of the fictitious cabaret act Kiki and Herb, played by Justin Bond
 Kiki Flores, a main character in The Puzzle Place, a TV series
 Kiki Harrison, Julia Roberts' character in the film America's Sweethearts
 Katherine Tango, a character nicknamed "Kiki" in the film Tango and Cash
 Kiki the Cyber Squirrel, the mascot of the raster graphics editor Krita
 Kiki the Frog, a character in 1960s children's TV show Hector's House
 Kiki the Hyperactive Monkey of Sentosa, host of the Singaporean show Magical Sentosa

Films
 Kiki (1926 film), an American film starring Norma Talmadge
 Kiki (1931 film), an American remake of the 1926 film starring Mary Pickford
 Kiki (1932 film), a French-German film starring Anny Ondra
 Kiki (2016 film), an American-Swedish documentary film

Other uses in arts and entertainment
 Kiki (magazine), a magazine for young girls
 Kiki, the collective name for Kojiki and Nihon Shoki, the two most prominent texts of Japanese mythology
 Kiki (Kiana Lede album)

Radio stations
 KIKI (AM), licensed to Honolulu, Hawaii, United States
 KHVH, an AM station licensed to Honolulu, which held the call sign KIKI from 1973 to 1990
 KUBT, an FM station licensed to Honolulu, formerly KIKI, which operates an HD channel named KIKI

Other uses
 Kiki (gathering), an informal term meaning a social gathering primarily for gossip or generally having a good time
 Kiki Challenge, a social media challenge
 Bouba/kiki effect, an observed neurophysiological effect tying certain sounds to specific shapes

See also
 Kikis, a given name and surname
 Kikki (disambiguation)
 Keke (disambiguation)